Rıza Doğan (1931 – 21 April 2004) was a Turkish wrestler. He was born in Ankara. He won a silver medal in lightweight at the 1956 Summer Olympics in Melbourne.

References

External links
 

1931 births
2004 deaths
Olympic wrestlers of Turkey
Wrestlers at the 1956 Summer Olympics
Turkish male sport wrestlers
Olympic silver medalists for Turkey
Olympic medalists in wrestling
Medalists at the 1956 Summer Olympics
20th-century Turkish people
21st-century Turkish people